Hugh D. Matthews (born July 23, 1947) is an American politician. He served as a Democratic member for the 145th district of the Georgia House of Representatives.

Life and career 
Matthews was born in Colquitt County, Georgia. He attended Abraham Baldwin Agricultural College, and served in the United States Army.

In 1979, Matthews was elected to the 145th district of the Georgia House of Representatives, succeeding Dorsey R. Matthews. He served until 1987, when he was succeeded by C. J. Powell.

References 

1947 births
Living people
People from Colquitt County, Georgia
Democratic Party members of the Georgia House of Representatives
20th-century American politicians